{{Speciesbox
|image = Senecio glaucus Kuwait.jpg
|image_caption = Jaffa groundsel
|taxon = Senecio glaucus
|authority = L.
|synonyms = Senecio coronopifolius Desf.Senecio joppensis Dinsm.Senecio ruepellii Sch.Bip.Senecio desfontainei DruceSenecio laxiflorus Viv.Senecio subdentatus Ledeb
}}Senecio glaucus is an annual member of the Asteraceae and species of the genus Senecio. It is found from the western Mediterranean to Central Asia in sandy, well-drained soil, particularly coastal and desert dunes. 

Common names
  

Distribution
Found in sandy soils of coastal plains, strands,  and steppes.

Native to the Palearctic:Middle East: Afghanistan, Algeria, Egypt - Sinai, Israel, Iran, Iraq, Jordan, Kuwait, Lebanon, Libya, Morocco, Pakistan, Saudi Arabia, Syria, Tunisia, Turkey - AnatoliaMacaronesia: Canary Islands - Gran Canaria, Fuerteventura, Gomera, Hierro, Lanzarote, TenerifeEast Europe: Saratov Oblast, Volgograd Oblast, Astrakhan Oblast, Rostov Oblast, KalmykiyaSoutheastern Europe: Bulgaria, Crete, Crimea, Greece, Italy, Kosovo, Malta, Montenegro, Serbia, SicilySouthwestern Europe: Balearic Islands, France, Portugal, SpainWestern Asia: IsraelIndia:Himachal Pradesh, Jammu and KashmirCaucasus: Adygea, Armenia, Azerbaijan, Chechnya, Dagestan, Georgia, Ingushetia, Kabardino-Balkaria, Karachay–Cherkessia, Krasnodar Krai, North Ossetia–Alania, Stavropol KraiSoviet Middle Asia''' Turkmenistan, Uzbekistan

Subspecies and variety synonymsSenecio glaucus subsp. coronopifolius (Maire) C. AlexanderSenecio glaucus subsp. cyprius MeikleSenecio glaucus L. subsp. glaucusSenecio coronopifolius Desf. var. calyculatus Emb. & MaireSenecio gallicus Chaix var. laxiflorus (Viv.) DC.Senecio gallicus Chaix subsp. coronopifolius'' (Desf.) Maire

References

glaucus
Flora of the Canary Islands
Plants described in 1753
Taxa named by Carl Linnaeus